The Madeleine is a river in north eastern France, in the Territoire de Belfort département. It is 25.4 km long, and its basin area is 92 km².

It begins in the Vosges mountains, near the commune of Lamadeleine-Val-des-Anges. It joins the river Saint-Nicolas in the village Bretagne at 340 m above sea level to form the river Bourbeuse. The river Bourbeuse is a tributary to the river Allan, which is a tributary to the river Doubs.

The Madeleine river flows through the communes of Étueffont, Anjoutey, Bourg-sous-Châtelet, Bethonvilliers, Lacollonge, Fontenelle, Petit-Croix and Novillard.

It is also a fishing area. The confluence with the Saint-Nicolas is in a marshy area.

References

Rivers of France
Rivers of the Territoire de Belfort
Rivers of Bourgogne-Franche-Comté